Adegbenga Adejumo (born 1986), known as Benga, is a British musician from Croydon, known for being a pioneer of dubstep record production. He has been featured on a variety of compilations including Mary Anne Hobbs's Warrior Dubz, Tempa's The Roots of Dubstep and the BBC Radio 1Xtra anniversary mix.

Career
Adejumo is of Yoruba Nigerian descent.

Inspired by UK garage producer Wookie, Benga would produce tunes on a PlayStation, and subsequently FruityLoops. As a teenager he would visit the Big Apple record shop in Croydon where he was introduced to Skream, and together they would help forge the sound of dubstep emerging in the early 2000s. His productions caught the attention of DJ Hatcha, who worked at the shop, and, by the age of 15, Benga had made his first record, "Skank", released on Big Apple's own record label in 2002.

Benga's second release was a collaboration with Skream, called "The Judgement". Further releases followed on Big Apple Records, Hotflush Recordings and Planet Mu, before Benga self-released his debut album Newstep in 2006. As dubstep garnered mainstream attention, Benga continued to release singles, including a collaboration with Coki of Digital Mystikz called "Night", that reached 98 in the UK Singles Chart in 2008. Diary of an Afro Warrior, Benga's second album, followed in the same year with Resident Advisor describing it as "one of the most anticipated LPs in dubstep yet."

In 2007 Benga along with fellow producers Skream and Artwork, formed the dubstep supergroup Magnetic Man. This resulted in the release of an EP and eponymous studio album in 2009 and 2010, respectively. Benga also produced Katy B's debut single "Katy on a Mission", which peaked at number 5 in the UK Singles Chart in 2010.

From January 2011, Benga joined BBC Radio 1 with Skream as part of 'In New DJs We Trust', and presented a weekly Friday night show. Skream and Benga performed together at Field Day music festival in Sydney on New Year's Day 2012.

Benga generated controversy in July 2012 after reportedly saying he wished to remove himself from dubstep, insisting that he no longer wanted to be a part of the genre. He went on to clarify his comments saying "For me to remain creative, I've kinda not got to call my music dubstep and for me to keep pushing boundaries and moving around, making songs... I can't call myself dubstep." 

In 2013, he released his third album Chapter II on Sony Music, which included the single "Forefather" featuring Kano. He also created an official remix of Donna Summer's "I Feel Love", which features on the tribute remix album Love To Love You Donna, and co-produced Dominique Young Unique's 2014 debut single "Throw It Down" with DJ Fresh.

On 2 February 2014, Adejumo announced on social media that following his engagement to Holly-Jae Treadgold, he was retiring to focus on raising a family. However, in May 2014, he announced plans to complete a new album.

In September 2015, Benga revealed via his Twitter account that mental health issues had been the reason for his retirement announcement. In an interview with The Guardian, he explained that he noticed issues in late 2013 and was subsequently sectioned in March 2014. He stated that drug use from the age of 17 had caused bipolar disorder, whilst excessive touring led to schizophrenia. In an interview with Annie Mac on BBC Radio 1 in 2018, Benga claimed to have deleted all of his productions from his hard drive during his hospital stay. He premiered a new track "Psychosis" on the radio show, inspired by and to treat his psychological experiences, and was released in February 2018 on his new Illuminate record label.

Discography

Albums

EPs

Singles

As lead artist

Benga & Skream

Hatcha & Benga

Benga & Walsh

Benga & Coki

Benga & Paul Trueman

Production credits

References

External links

Benga RBMA lecture

1986 births
Living people
Dubstep musicians
Black British musicians
Black British DJs
English people of Nigerian descent
English record producers
People from Croydon
People with bipolar disorder
People with schizophrenia
English people of Yoruba descent
Yoruba musicians
Planet Mu artists